Bayandalai (Rich ocean) is a sum (district) of Ömnögovi Province in southern Mongolia. In 2009, its population was 2,316.

References 

Districts of Ömnögovi Province